The Trial of Mile Budak was the one-day trial of Mile Budak and a number of other members of the government of the Independent State of Croatia for high treason and war crimes on 6 June 1945 in Zagreb. The trial was held by the Military Court of the II. Army of Yugoslavia. Seven of the accused were executed the following day, and another died in prison.

Apprehension
Following the Independent State of Croatia evacuation to Austria, several of the accused were apprehended by the British in their occupation zone in Austria. They were subsequently held at the Spittal detainment camp. On 17 May the British sent Nikola Mandić, Julije Makanec and Pavao Canki from Spittal to a train headed to Zagreb. They were joined en route by Nikola Steinfel and Mile Budak.

The Indicted
Mile Budak - Minister of Education (1941), Minister of Foreign Affairs (1943)
Pavao Canki - Minister of Justice and Religion (1943-1945)
Julije Makanec - Minister of Education (1943-1945)
Nikola Mandić - Prime Minister (1943-1945)
Ademaga Mešić - Doglavnik
Lavoslav Milić - General
Bruno Nardelli - Governor
Juraj Rukavina - Ustaša Colonel
Nikola Steinfel - Minister of the Armed Forces (1944-1945)
Ivan Vidnjević - President of "Mobile Kangoroo Court"

Sentences

Executed 7 June
Mile Budak 
Pavao Canki
Julije Makanec 
Nikola Mandić 
Nikola Steinfel
Juraj Rukavina 
Ivan Vidnjević

Life imprisonment
Ademaga Mešić (died at Stara Gradiška, 1945)

Twenty years imprisonment
Lavoslav Milić 
Bruno Nardelli

Notes

1945 in Croatia
World War II war crimes trials
1945 in Yugoslavia